The canton of Montoire-sur-le-Loir is an administrative division of the Loir-et-Cher department, central France. Its borders were modified at the French canton reorganisation which came into effect in March 2015. Its seat is in Montoire-sur-le-Loir.

It consists of the following communes:
 
Ambloy
Artins
Authon
Coulommiers-la-Tour
Crucheray
Les Essarts
Faye
Gombergean
Les Hayes
Houssay
Huisseau-en-Beauce
Lancé
Lavardin
Lunay
Marcilly-en-Beauce
Montoire-sur-le-Loir
Montrouveau
Naveil
Nourray
Périgny
Pray
Prunay-Cassereau
Rocé
Les Roches-l'Évêque
Saint-Amand-Longpré
Saint-Arnoult
Saint-Gourgon
Saint-Jacques-des-Guérets
Saint-Martin-des-Bois
Saint-Rimay
Sasnières
Selommes
Ternay
Thoré-la-Rochette
Tourailles
Troo
Vallée-de-Ronsard
Villavard
Villechauve
Villedieu-le-Château
Villemardy
Villeporcher
Villerable
Villeromain
Villetrun
Villiersfaux

References

Cantons of Loir-et-Cher